Carlo Angelo Furletti (born 1 November 1945 in Fivizzano, Tuscany, Italy) is a former Australian politician. He was a Liberal member of the Victorian Legislative Council from 1996 to 2002, representing Templestowe Province. Born in Italy, he arrived in Australia at the age of four.

He served as Parliamentary Secretary to the Shadow Minister for Multicultural Affairs from 1999 to 2002. He was a Member of the Law Reform Committee 1996-99 and the Legislative Council Privileges Committee 1999–2002.

References 

1945 births
Living people
Liberal Party of Australia members of the Parliament of Victoria
Members of the Victorian Legislative Council
Australian politicians of Italian descent
21st-century Australian politicians